Verdikoussa is a village, a community and a municipal unit of the Elassona municipality. Before the 2011 local government it was an independent community. The 2011 census recorded 1,812 inhabitants in the village and 2,254 in the community. The community of Verdikoussa covers an area of 101.267 km2.

Administrative division
The community of Verdikoussa consists of six settlements:
 Ampelia
 Koutsoufliani
 Paliampela
 Paliaskia
 Varkos
 Verdikoussa

Economy
The population of Verdikoussa is occupied in animal husbandry, agriculture (tobacco and organic vegetables) and lumbering.

Population
According to the 2011 census, the population of the settlement of Verdikoussa was 1,812 people, an increase of almost 11% compared with the population of the previous census of 2001.

See also
 List of settlements in the Larissa regional unit

References

Populated places in Larissa (regional unit)